The American Rally Association is a stage rallying sanctioning body in the United States. The organization sanctions the American Rally Association Presented by DirtFish National Championship. It is currently managed by the United States Auto Club. Doug Shepard was appointed the president. The organization was founded by Tim O'Neil, Martin Headland, and Chris Cyr of Team O'Neil Rally School in 2016.

Sanctioned events
The ARA sanctions all of the events in the American Rally Association Presented by DirtFish National Championship calendar. They also sanction many regional rally events that are classified into two categories; Regional and Super Regional.

Championship events 
 Sno*Drift Rally
 Rally in the 100 Acre Wood
 DirtFish Olympus Rally
 Oregon Trail Rally
 Southern Ohio Forest Rally
 New England Forest Rally
 Ojibwe Forests Rally
 Susquehannock Trail Performance Rally
 Lake Superior Performance Rally

Regional events 
 Headwaters Regional Rally
 Summer Sno*Drift 
 Missouri Ozark Rally
 Tour de Forest Rally
 Oregon Regional Rally
 Rally Nevada
 Nemadji Trail Rally
 Ridge Rally

Super Regional events 
 Bristol Forest Rally
 Rally Colorado
 Show Me Rally

Champions

Official Website
Official Website

References

https://www.americanrallyassociation.org/about

https://www.teamoneil.com/about/

Rally competitions in the United States
Auto racing series in the United States
Auto racing organizations in the United States
Rally racing series